Kinnaraya or Kinnarayo  also Kinnara are a social group or caste amongst the Sinhalese of Sri Lanka. Like the Burakumin  of Japan and Paraiyar of the Tamil Nadu state in South India, they were segregated from the mainstream society yet played a vital role as mat weavers for the mainstream community.

Origins
As the mainstream Sinhalese speakers claim North Indian ethnic origins the presence of many South Indian type functional Jatis like the Kinnaraya indicate a complex migration history from India to Sri Lanka. But Kinnarayas do indicate vestiges of tribal origins like the other formerly untouchable caste of Rodiyas. Although they have become part and parcel of the caste structure albeit with a primary function associated with mat weaving. They are also used as agricultural workers, weavers and domestic help throughout the country.

Roots
Some anthropologists believe that the early society of Sri Lanka looked to neighboring South India for manpower to fulfill functional needs as land was cleared and many new villages found. Also the indigenous people of Sri Lanka known in the legends as Yakkas and Nagas also fused with the caste structure usually at the bottom as marginal people providing needed support services for survival as their habitats were cleared or simply taken over. Unlike other functional Sinhalese castes in Sri Lanka there is anecdotal evidence that along with Rodiyas, that Kinnaras were an indigenous tribal group that eventually became a Dalit-like caste.

Etymology of Kinnaraya
The etymology of the word Kinnara is complex and number of theories abound. But it is not clear how this early Vedic word or word similar to it came to describe this insignificant community. Most Hindu and Buddhist literature around the world have differing meaning for this word.

Sub divisions
There used to be many totemic or clan likes subdivisions within the caste that are not attested in known literature.

Role in folk religion
Although great many Sinhalese purport to profess the conservative Theravada Buddhism there is a thriving belief in Demons, Spirits, Hindu Gods and connected rituals such as spirit possession, cursing ceremonies throughout the country also referred as the Spirit Religion or Folk Tradition.  As a marginal people, the role played by Kinnaraya in this folk tradition is not well documented. The community is noted for its performances of Sokari, the comic opera performed on the kamatha threshing floor in honor of goddess Pattini and god Kataragama. Despite harsh economic conditions, the Kinnarayas still preserve a sizable share of the island's indigenous heritage.

Current status
As a numerically small and culturally insignificant community they have not been able to upgrade their social position in the society. Many still languish at the bottom as agricultural workers, army recruits to the front line in the civil war since the Black July pogroms, domestic workers and as overseas maids in the Middle East whose hard earned foreign exchange is vital for the economic wellbeing  of the country.

External links
 Indigenous Lanka: Consensus for Survival
 Introduction, Craft History, Developments Since Independence
Singhalesische Kasten German article
Caste amongst the Sinhalese

Dalit communities
Sinhalese castes